The International Flat Earth Research Society (also known as the Flat Earth Society) is a global organization of people who advocate the belief that the Earth is flat.

Flat Earth Society may also refer to:

 Flat Earth Society (band), a Belgian band
 "Flat Earth Society", a song by Bad Religion from the album Against the Grain